This is a list of ecoregions of Guatemala as defined by the World Wildlife Fund and the Freshwater Ecoregions of the World database.

Terrestrial ecoregions

Tropical and subtropical moist broadleaf forests

 Central American Atlantic moist forests
 Central American montane forests
 Chiapas montane forests
 Petén–Veracruz moist forests
 Sierra Madre de Chiapas moist forests
 Yucatán moist forests

Tropical and subtropical dry broadleaf forests
 Central American dry forests
 Chiapas Depression dry forests

Tropical and subtropical coniferous forests
 Central American pine-oak forests

Deserts and xeric shrublands
 Motagua Valley thornscrub

Mangroves
 Belizean Coast mangroves
 Northern Honduras mangroves
 Northern Dry Pacific Coast mangroves

Freshwater ecoregions

Tropical and subtropical coastal rivers
 Grijalva - Usumacinta
 Quintana Roo - Motagua
 Chiapas - Fonseca

Tropical and subtropical upland rivers
 Upper Usumacinta

Marine ecoregions

Tropical Northwestern Atlantic
 Western Caribbean (includes the Mesoamerican Barrier Reef)

Tropical East Pacific
 Chiapas-Nicaragua

See also
List of ecoregions in Belize
List of ecoregions in El Salvador
List of ecoregions in Mexico

References

 
Ecoregions
Guatemala